NWPP may stand for:
Nepal Workers' and Peasants' Party
Non-woven Polypropylene
Navigable Waters Protection Program, which administered the 2002 Canadian Navigable Waters Protection Act